Nicolas Clausse de Marchaumont (c. 1545 – September 12, 1573) was a French Roman Catholic prelate. He was bishop of Châlons between 1571 and 1573.

He was the third son of Côme Clausse and Marie, the sister of bishop Jérôme Burgensis. In 1571, Burgensis resigned from bishopric; Marchaumont succeeded him. He was consecrated by Cardinal Charles of Lorraine.

Marchaumont died on September 12, 1573, at the age of 28 after a one-year, one-month and fifteen-days-long bishopric. Then the title was given to his younger brother Côme Clausse de Marchaumont.

References 

Bishops of Châlons-sur-Marne
16th-century French Roman Catholic bishops
1540s births
1573 deaths
Year of birth uncertain